Longue-Pointe-de-Mingan is a municipality in the Côte-Nord region of the province of Quebec in Canada.

The descriptive name Longue-Pointe (French for "Long Point") refers to a long spit of sand west of the village that has had various names through the centuries: first called Longue Pointe on a map of 1735, followed by the English form of Long Point in the late 17th and early 18th century, then Mingan Point on the map of Captain Carver (1776). James Cook and Placide Vigneau called it Pointe de Mingan (1784) and Longue-Pointe-de-Mingan (1857) respectively.

History
Around 1880, the first settlers arrived, mostly from Paspébiac, themselves descendants of Acadians. In 1885, the post office opened.

The municipality was officially created in 1966 as Longue-Pointe, but renamed to Longue-Pointe-de-Mingan on April 5, 1997.

Demographics

Population

Language

Tourism
In the region, there is a statue of a Giant Puffin. It is a tribute to the seabirds that live in colonies around the town's shores. On July 5, 2010, Canada Post made a commemorative stamp of the giant Atlantic Puffin as part of its Roadside Attractions collection.

The town is also the location of the Mingan Island Cetacean Study (MICS), a research station that studies marine animals. MICS gives tourists the opportunity to support the organization by allowing visitors to ride on a boat with the research team. While on this boat, visitors can expect to come within meters of whales and other marine animals.

See also
 List of municipalities in Quebec

References 

Municipalities in Quebec
Incorporated places in Côte-Nord